Mayfield Dairy Farms is a United States dairy products company, with its headquarters in Athens, Tennessee and additional production plants in Birmingham, Alabama. From 1990 to 2020 it was under the ownership of Dean Foods.Dairy Farmers of America acquired Mayfield in March, 2020.

Current Mayfield's range of products include milk, chocolate milk, ice cream, and juice.

History
The company was founded in 1923 by T.B. Mayfield, Jr., and is now run by his grandson, Scottie Mayfield. It employs nearly 2000 people. Mayfield products are sold in eleven states: Tennessee, Georgia, Alabama, South Carolina, North Carolina, Florida, Kentucky, Virginia, Maryland, Ohio, Louisiana, and Mississippi. Dean Foods bought Mayfield Dairy in 1990.

Innovations
Mayfield is known for a history of innovation. The company boasts that founder T.B. Mayfield had the first milk plant in the area capable of pasteurizing milk.

In 1970 Mayfield's Athens plant was the first in the industry to successfully implement in-plant blow-molding for production of plastic milk jugs. In 1988 Mayfield was the first dairy to use an opaque plastic milk jug that protects milk from ultraviolet light. In 1995, Mayfield launched the single-serve Chug milk bottle for Dean Foods. The single-serve bottle increased milk consumption by letting milk compete with single-serving soft drinks. In 2002 its Clik-Top re-sealable ice cream carton, including a break-seal that makes the package easier to open and a locking tab to keep the carton closed during storage, was greeted as a packaging first.

In 2006 Mayfield started a multi-author company blog, featuring posts by CEO Scottie Mayfield, stories from inside the business, news about new ice cream flavors, and articles submitted by customers. The Mayfield Dairy Blog was featured on the Diva Marketing Blog as an example of the use of social media in marketing. In 2007 the company won an Effie Award, presented by the American Marketing Association for successfully marketing four new ice cream flavors without discounts, using a campaign in which customers were encouraged to "vote" for their favorite new flavor.

Visitor centers
The company maintains two visitor centers, one in Athens, Tennessee and the other in Braselton, Georgia and offers tours of its production plants in those locations.

See also
Squround

References

External links
 

Dairy products companies of the United States
Dean Foods brands
Companies based in Tennessee
McMinn County, Tennessee
Single-serve containers
Ice cream brands
1923 establishments in Tennessee
American companies established in 1923
Food and drink companies established in 1923
Companies that filed for Chapter 11 bankruptcy in 2019